The National Youth Organisation (NYO) is a representative body of students and young people in the Republic of Ireland, which focuses on issues that affect young people.

The Organisation has launched numerous campaigns, namely a national youth protest in 2008 which focused on the lack of say young people have in society. The National Youth Organisation is headed by an Executive which is chaired by the President of the Organisation. As of 2008, the President was Aidan McGrath.

The Organisation is involved in a number of campaigns including anti-bullying, mental health campaigns, promotion of youth council campaigns, student council promotion campaigns and even health campaign, it was also involved in creating an advertisement campaign alongside the Health Service Executive to promote positive mental health for young people.

References

Youth organisations based in the Republic of Ireland